Metodi Ananiev (born ) is a Bulgarian male volleyball and beach volleyball player. He was part of the bulgarian team of CSKA Sofia and Bulgaria men's national volleyball team.

References

External links
 Profile at FIVB.org

1986 births
Living people
Bulgarian men's volleyball players
Place of birth missing (living people)
Bulgarian beach volleyball players
Men's beach volleyball players